Ernest Gillet (13 September 1856 – 6 May 1940) was a French composer and cellist, the brother of oboist and composer Georges Gillet.

Biography 
A student at the École Niedermeyer de Paris then of Auguste-Joseph Franchomme at the Conservatoire de Paris, Gillet won the First Prize of the Conservatoire in 1874 and became a cellist of the Orchestre de l'Opéra de Paris (1875–1882). Solo cellist of the Concerts Colonne, the Concerts Lamoureux and the Concerts de Monte-Carlo, Gillet obtained a great success with his operetta La Fille de la mère Michel, with a libretto by Daniel Riche in 1893 as well as with his piece Loin du bal (1888) that can be heard in the feature film The Dancing Masters with Laurel and Hardy in 1943.

Works 
Gillet wrote more than four hundred pieces, including:
Operetta
 La Fille de la mère Michel (1893)

Compositions

Bibliography 
 Edmund Sebastian Joseph van der Straeten, History of the Violoncello, the Viol Da Gamba, 1915, p. 537
 Florian Bruyas, Histoire de l'opérette en France, 1855-1965, 1974, (p. 336)
 Oscar Thompson, Bruce Bohle, The International Cyclopedia of Music and Musicians, 1985, p. 822
 Benoît Duteurtre, L'opérette en France, 1997, p. 99, 
 Maurice Hinson, Wesley Roberts, The Piano in Chamber Ensemble: An Annotated Guide, 2006, p. 630
 Bodewalt Lampe, Stephanie Chase, Popular Classics for Violin and Piano, 2013, p. IX

References

External links 

 Ernest Gillet on ECMF (1918–1944)
 Ernest Gillet on CND
 
 Méditation on Youtube

1856 births
1940 deaths
19th-century classical composers
19th-century French composers
20th-century classical composers
Conservatoire de Paris alumni
French classical cellists
Musicians from Paris
20th-century French composers
20th-century cellists